Kim Sang-bum (born August 14, 1954) is a South Korean film editor.

Filmography 

Art Museum by the Zoo (1998)
Judgement (short film, 1999)
A-rong's Big Expedition (1999)
A Great Chinese Restaurant (1999)
The Spy (1999)
Yellow Hair (1999)
Tell Me Something (1999)
Memento Mori (1999)
Spooky School (2000) 
Interview (2000)
Bloody Beach (2000) 
Joint Security Area (2000)
Ghost Taxi (2000)
Indian Summer (2001)
The Humanist (2001)
My Sassy Girl (2001)
Guns & Talks (2001)
Waikiki Brothers (2001)
Hi! Dharma! (2001)
No Blood No Tears (2002)
L'Abri (Bus Stop) (2002)
Sympathy for Mr. Vengeance (2002)
The Way Home (2002)
No Comment (2002)
Surprise (aka Surprise Party) (2002)
YMCA Baseball Team (2002)
A Bizarre Love Triangle (2002)
Conduct Zero (2002)
Double Agent (2003)
The Classic (2003)
Wishing Stairs (2003)
Oldboy (2003)
Ice Rain (2004)
Windstruck (2004)
Someone Special (2004)
Hi! Dharma 2: Showdown in Seoul (2004)
Three... Extremes (2004)
Blood Rain (2005)
Sympathy for Lady Vengeance (2005)
Murder, Take One (2005)
Sad Movie (2005)
The Beast and the Beauty (2005)
Boy Goes to Heaven (2005)
King and the Clown (2005)

If You Were Me 2 (2006)
Daisy (2006)
Bloody Tie (2006)
Radio Star (2006)
Traces of Love (2006)
Once in a Summer (2006)
I'm a Cyborg, But That's OK (2006)
Project Makeover (2007)
Bunt (2007)
My Son (2007)
Epitaph (2007)
For Eternal Hearts (2007)
The Happy Life (2007)
Going by the Book (2007)
Shadows in the Palace (2007)
All We Need Is Courage (2008)
Girl Scout (2008)
Like Father, Like Son (2008)
Sunny (2008)
My Mighty Princess (2008)
Go Go 70s (2008)
Thirst (2009)
My Girlfriend Is a Cyborg (2009)
A Blood Pledge (2009)
Possessed (2009)
The Sword with No Name (2009)
Good Morning President (2009)
Men without Women (2009)
Blades of Blood (2010)
The Servant (2010)
The Man from Nowhere (2010)
Cyrano Agency (2010)
The Recipe (2010)
The Unjust (2010)
Haunters (2010)
Battlefield Heroes (2011)
If You Were Me 5 (2011)
Mama (2011)
The Front Line (2011)
Leafie, A Hen into the Wild (2011)
Hindsight (2011)
Pained (2011)A Reason to Live (2011)Unbowed (2012)Pacemaker (2012)Nameless Gangster: Rules of the Time (2012)Architecture 101 (2012)Duresori: The Voice of the East (2012)A Muse (2012)The Concubine (2012)Whatcha Wearin'? (2012)The Tower (2012)Day Trip (short film, 2012)The Berlin File (2013)South Bound (2013)Born to Sing (2013)Hide and Seek (2013)Hope (2013)Hwayi: A Monster Boy (2013)Commitment (2013)11 A.M. (2013)The Attorney (2013)Man in Love (2014)Venus Talk (2014)Tabloid Truth (2014)Obsessed (2014)Mad Sad Bad (2014)Kundo: Age of the Rampant (2014)Haemoo (2014)Scarlet Innocence (2014)Cart (2014)Chronicle of a Blood Merchant (2015)C'est si bon (2015)The Shameless (2015)Minority Opinion (2015)  Inside Men (2015)  The Sound of a Flower (2015)  The Handmaiden (2016)  
Seondal: The Man Who Sells the River (2016)  
Asura: The City of Madness (2016)
Misbehavior (2017) 
New Trial (2017)
Lucid Dream (2017)  
A Taxi Driver (2017) 
I Can Speak (2017)
The Sheriff in Town (2017)
The Spy Gone North (2018)
Black Money (2019)
Decision to Leave (2022)

Awards 
2002 1st Korean Film Awards: Best Editing (Sympathy for Mr. Vengeance)
2004 12th Chunsa Film Art Awards: Best Editing (Oldboy)
2004 41st Grand Bell Awards: Best Editing (Oldboy)
2005 13th Chunsa Film Art Awards: Best Editing (Blood Rain)
2006 43rd Grand Bell Awards: Best Editing (Murder, Take One)
2010 47th Grand Bell Awards: Best Editing (The Man from Nowhere)
2010 8th Korean Film Awards: Best Editing (The Man from Nowhere)

References

External links 
 
 
 

Living people
1954 births
South Korean film editors